Arthur Blennerhassett (19 February 1719 – 8 June 1799) was an Anglo-Irish politician.

Blennerhassett was the son of John Blennerhassett and Jane Denny. He was elected to serve in the Irish House of Commons as the Member of Parliament for Tralee between 1743 and 1761. In 1775 he was elected as the MP for Kerry, sitting until 1783.

He married Jane Girardot (former wife of Gustavus Hamilton [deceased] and mother of James Hamilton who later became Dean of Cloyne and the first astronomer of Armagh Observatory); together they had two daughters.

References

1719 births
1799 deaths
Irish MPs 1727–1760
Irish MPs 1769–1776
Irish MPs 1776–1783
People from County Kerry
18th-century Anglo-Irish people
Arthur
Members of the Parliament of Ireland (pre-1801) for County Kerry constituencies